The 1926 Geneva Covenanters football team was an American football team that represented Geneva College as a member of the Tri-State Conference during the 1926 college football season. Led by first-year head coach Bo McMillin, the team compiled an overall record of 8–2 with a mark of 4–0 in conference play, winning the Tri-State title.

Schedule

References

Geneva
Geneva Golden Tornadoes football seasons
Geneva Covenanters football